The Sitovo inscription is an inscription in Bulgaria that has yet to be satisfactorily translated.

Discovery
The inscription was discovered in 1928, on the wall of a rock shelter near the village of Sitovo, close to Plovdiv, Bulgaria. It was first documented by amateur archaeologist Alexander Peev. The inscription has been tentatively dated to between 300 and 100 BCE.

In 1943, Peev was executed by firing squad on suspicion of sending a coded message to the Soviet Union. He had sent an example of the text to Soviet archaeologists, in the hope that they could decipher its meaning. The inscription was published in 1950 by Z. R. Morfova, and Peev was posthumously awarded the Order of Lenin for his resistance efforts against the Bulgarian government.

Possible translations
Amateurs and professionals have attempted to translate the inscription. It has been variously identified as local ancient language, Celtic, Slavic, and Phrygian.

See also
Vinča symbols

References

Inscriptions in undeciphered writing systems
Prehistoric Bulgaria
Rhodope Mountains
Tourist attractions in Plovdiv Province